Samuel D. Schmucker (February 26, 1844 – March 3, 1911) was an American lawyer, and was judge of the Maryland Court of Appeals from 1898 to 1911.

Biography
Born at Gettysburg, Pennsylvania, the son of respected Lutheran theologian Samuel Simon Schmucker, Samuel D. Schmucker graduated from Pennsylvania College (now, Gettysburg College) in 1863. He served as a sergeant in the 26th Pennsylvania Regiment in the Union Army in the American Civil War. He received his law degree from the University of New York (now, NYU) in 1865. He practiced law for over 30 years in Baltimore, Maryland and served as president and trustees of various financial and charitable organizations before his appointment to the state's highest court in 1898. He died in Baltimore in 1911.

References

External links

Judges of the Maryland Court of Appeals
1844 births
1911 deaths
People from Gettysburg, Pennsylvania
Lawyers from Baltimore
Gettysburg College alumni
New York University School of Law alumni
19th-century American judges
19th-century American lawyers
Union Army soldiers